St Morhaiarn's Church is a medieval church in the village of Gwalchmai in Anglesey, Wales. The building dates from the 14th century and underwent extensive renovations in 1845 by Reverend J. Wynne Jones. It was designated a Grade II*-listed building on 4 May 1971.

References

External links
 

14th-century church buildings in Wales
Grade II* listed churches in Anglesey